Exarata is a group of plants described as a genus in 1992.

Exarata contains only one known species, Exarata chocoensis, native to the Pacific coastal regions of Colombia and Ecuador.

References

Schlegeliaceae
Monotypic Lamiales genera
Flora of Colombia
Flora of Ecuador